DSK may refer to:

 Dera Ismail Khan Airport (IATA code)
 German International School Cape Town (Deutsche Internationale Schule Kapstadt)
 Deutsche Schule Kiew
 Deutsche Schule Kobe/European School
 Deutschsprachige Konferenz der Pfadfinderverbände
 Division Schnelle Kräfte, the German Armed Forces Rapid Forces Division
 DoD Secure Kiosk, a device used by the United States Air Force
 Dominique Strauss-Kahn (born 1949), French economist and politician
 Downstream key—see Keying (graphics)
 Dvorak Simplified Keyboard, alternative to the QWERTY keyboard layout
 DSK Bank, Bulgarian bank
 DSP Starter Kit, supplied by Texas Instruments